Vasta Roy "Vas" Blackwood (born 19 October 1962) is a British actor from London.

Blackwood played Lenny Henry's sidekick Winston Churchill in The Lenny Henry Show (1987) and David Sinclair in Casualty (1996–97). Since playing Rory Breaker in the hit film Lock, Stock and Two Smoking Barrels (1998) he has had a number of film roles, including Mean Machine (2001), 9 Dead Gay Guys (2002) and Creep (2004).  In 2005 he appeared in A Bear's Tail, a spin-off of Bo' Selecta!. He also made an appearance as Lennox Gilbey in Only Fools and Horses. He also played main character Dexter in Spatz.
 
In 2008 he did voiceover work on the video game Fable II.

In 2013 he did voiceover work on a Tesco advertisement, this was launched and played on various different channels within the United Kingdom in the Summer period.

Blackwood was founder of virtual online blog Vastaman.com, which is now defunct. His cousin is the media personality Richard Blackwood.

Filmography

References

External links
 
 Vastaman Website

1962 births
British people of Barbadian descent
British male voice actors
British male video game actors
British male film actors
British male television actors
Black British male actors
Male actors from London
Living people